Georginio Rutter (born 20 April 2002) is a French professional footballer who plays as a forward for Premier League club Leeds United.

Club career

Rennes

Rutter made his professional debut for Rennes on 26 September 2020, coming on for Eduardo Camavinga against Saint Étienne.

Hoffenheim

On 1 February 2021, Rutter signed with Bundesliga side Hoffenheim. On 21 February 2021, he scored his first Bundesliga goal in a 4–0 win against Werder Bremen. On 14 August 2021, he scored in Hoffenheim's opening game of the Bundesliga season, in a 4–0 win against Augsburg at the WWK Arena.

On 27 November 2021, he scored twice in Hoffenheim's 6–3 win against Greuther Fürth at the Sportpark Ronhof.

Leeds United
On 14 January 2023, Rutter signed with Premier League side Leeds United on a five and a half year contract for a club record fee rising to £36million.

Personal life
Rutter is of Martiniquais descent through his father, and Réunionnais descent through his mother.

Career statistics

References

External links
 
 
 

2002 births
Living people
Sportspeople from Vannes
French footballers
France youth international footballers
Association football forwards
Stade Rennais F.C. players
TSG 1899 Hoffenheim players
Leeds United F.C. players
Championnat National 3 players
Ligue 1 players
Bundesliga players
Premier League players
French expatriate footballers
Expatriate footballers in Germany
French expatriate sportspeople in Germany
French people of Martiniquais descent
French people of Réunionnais descent
Footballers from Brittany